Cameroon competed at the 2016 Summer Olympics in Rio de Janeiro, Brazil, from 5 to 21 August 2016. It was the nation's fourteenth consecutive appearance at the Summer Olympics.

Cameroon Olympic Sports Committee sent a total of 24 athletes, 5 men and 19 women, to the Games, competing in six different sports. For the second straight time in history, Cameroon was represented by more female than male athletes due to its presence of the women's volleyball team.

Notable athletes in the Cameroon team were professional boxers Mahaman Smaila and Hassan N'Dam N'Jikam, who both staged their Olympic comebacks in Rio de Janeiro for nearly a decade, and wrestler Annabelle Ali, who joined triple jumper and double gold medalist Françoise Mbango-Etone as the only Cameroonians to appear in three consecutive editions of the Games. Middleweight boxer Wilfried Ntsengue, the youngest member of the team (aged 18), was the nation's flag bearer in the opening ceremony.

Cameroon left Rio de Janeiro without a single Olympic medal. Ali narrowly missed out of Cameroon's first medal of the Games, after losing the match to Russia's Ekaterina Bukina for the bronze in the women's 75 kg category.

Athletics (track and field)

Cameroonian athletes achieved qualifying standards in the following athletics events (up to a maximum of 3 athletes in each event):

Key
 Note – Ranks given for track events are within the athlete's heat only
 Q = Qualified for the next round
 q = Qualified for the next round as a fastest loser or, in field events, by position without achieving the qualifying target
 NR = National record
 N/A = Round not applicable for the event
 Bye = Athlete not required to compete in round

Field events

Boxing

Cameroon entered four boxers to compete in each of the following weight classes into the Olympic boxing tournament. Simplice Fotsala, Wilfried Ntsengue, and 2008 Olympian Mahaman Smaila had claimed their Olympic spots at the 2016 African Qualification Tournament in Yaoundé. Returning for his second Games from a 12-year absence, light heavyweight boxer Hassan N'Dam N'Jikam rounded out the Cameroonian roster with his semifinal triumph at the 2016 APB and WSB Olympic Qualifier in Vargas, Venezuela.

Judo

Cameroon qualified one judoka for the women's half-heavyweight category (78 kg) at the Games. Vanessa Atangana earned a continental quota spot from the Africa region as Cameroon's top-ranked judoka outside of direct qualifying position in the IJF World Ranking List of May 30, 2016.

Volleyball

Indoor

Women's tournament

Cameroon women's volleyball team qualified for the Olympics by attaining a top finish and securing a lone outright berth at the African Olympic Qualifying Tournament in Yaoundé.

Team roster

Group play

Weightlifting

Cameroon qualified one male and one female weightlifter for the Rio Olympics by virtue of a top five national finish (for men) and top four (for women), respectively, at the 2016 African Championships. The team had to allocate these places to individual athletes by June 20, 2016.

Wrestling

Cameroon qualified three wrestlers for each of the following weight classes into the Olympic tournament, as a result of their semifinal triumphs at the 2016 African & Oceania Qualification Tournament.

Key
 VT - Victory by Fall.
 PP - Decision by Points - the loser with technical points.
 PO - Decision by Points - the loser without technical points.
 ST – Technical superiority – the loser without technical points and a margin of victory of at least 8 (Greco-Roman) or 10 (freestyle) points.

Women's freestyle

References

External links

 
 

Nations at the 2016 Summer Olympics
2016
Olympics